List of German U-boats in World War II (1-599)

 List of German U-boats in World War II (600-4712)

World War II raiding careers
.U-boat raiding careers
U-boat raiding careers
U-boat raiding careers
U-boat raiding careers